NGC 655 is a lenticular galaxy located 400 million light-years away in the constellation Cetus. It was discovered in a sky-survey by Ormond Stone on December 12, 1885.

On July 23, 2010, supernova SN 2010gp in NGC 655 was announced, reaching magnitude 15.5 on July 22. It was offset by 22″ west and 47″ south of the nucleus. Earlier, in 2000, the type II supernova SN 2000bg had also appeared in this galaxy.

See also
 List of NGC objects (1–1000)

References 

Lenticular galaxies
Cetus (constellation)
655
Astronomical objects discovered in 1885
006262